Han Zilong (born 6 April 1994) is a Chinese footballer who currently plays for Zibo Cuju in the China League One.

Club career
Han Zilong joined Hebei Elite's youth academy in 2010 and received training with the club at Brazil between 2010 and 2013. He returned to China in 2014 when Hebei Elite turned to professional club and joined China League Two. Han made his senior debut as well as the club's first professional match on 30 March 2014, in the first round of 2014 Chinese FA Cup which Hebei lost to Lijiang Jiayunhao 2–0. He scored 19 goals in 61 league appearances for the club from 2014 to 2017 League Two season. 

Han transferred to Chinese Super League side Changchun Yatai on 10 February 2018. On 2 March 2018, he made his debut for the club in a 1–1 away draw against Shanghai Greenland Shenhua, coming on as a substitute for Tan Long in the 88th minute.

Career statistics
.

References

External links
 

1994 births
Living people
Chinese footballers
Footballers from Shenyang
Changchun Yatai F.C. players
Chinese Super League players
China League One players
China League Two players
Association football midfielders